Rock salmon, also called rock eel, flake,  huss or Sweet William, is a dish popular in Britain, based on shark, often served as part of a fish and chips dish.

The dish can be one of many species of small shark, including  the spiny dogfish (Squalus acanthias),  starry smooth-hound (Mustelus asterias), rough-hound (Scyliorhinus canicula) and bull huss (Scyliorhinus stellaris).
  
Rock salmon is consumed in many European countries. However, the spiny dogfish is now an endangered species due to overfishing and is classed as Vulnerable on the IUCN Red List and the North East Atlantic population is classed as Critically Endangered.

References

Fish products sales
British seafood dishes